João Souza became the champion after beating Diego Junqueira in straight sets 6–4, 6–2.

Seeds

Draw

Finals

Top half

Bottom half

References
 Main Draw
 Qualifying Draw

Santos Brasil Tennis Open - Singles
2011 Singles